Cedric Miller (born August 8, 1964) is a Bahamian-French retired basketball player. He was a naturalized French citizen and played many years in France for several clubs. He also played in Argentina, Portugal and Colombia.

Honours
Cholet
 French Cup (2): 1998, 1999
Rotterdam
 DBL Top Scorer: 1988–89

References

External links
 Basketballreference profile

1964 births
Living people
American expatriate basketball people in France
American expatriate basketball people in the Netherlands
Bahamian men's basketball players
French men's basketball players
Feyenoord Basketball players
Dutch Basketball League players
Hampton Pirates men's basketball players
Caen Basket Calvados players
Cholet Basket players
BCM Gravelines players
SOMB Boulogne-sur-Mer players
Atenas basketball players